Kichera is an urban locality (an urban-type settlement) in Severo-Baykalsky District of the Republic of Buryatia, Russia. As of the 2010 Census, its population was 1,375.

History
Urban-type settlement status was granted to Kichera in 1979.

Administrative and municipal status
Within the framework of administrative divisions, the urban-type settlement (inhabited locality) of Kichera is incorporated within Severo-Baykalsky District as Kichera Urban-Type Settlement (an administrative division of the district). As a municipal division, Kichera Urban-Type Settlement is incorporated within Severo-Baykalsky Municipal District as Kichera Urban Settlement.

References

Notes

Sources

Urban-type settlements in Buryatia
1979 establishments in the Soviet Union
Populated places in Severo-Baykalsky District